1D, 1-D, or 1d can refer to:
 Alpha-1D adrenergic receptor
 Astra 1D, a satellite
 Canon EOS-1D, Canon's first professional digital camera
 Long March 1D, a satellite
 One-dimensional space in physics and mathematics
 One Direction, an English-Irish boy band
 Penny (British pre-decimal coin), routinely abbreviated 1d.
 1D, the hexadecimal code for the Group Separator control character

See also
ID (disambiguation)
LD (disambiguation)